The 1983 New Zealand rugby union tour of Britain was a series of eight matches played by the New Zealand national rugby union team (the All Blacks) in Scotland and England in October and November 1983. New Zealand won five of their eight games, drew one and lost the other two. They won neither of the two international matches, drawing with Scotland and losing to England. In the non-international fixtures they also suffered a defeat by the English Midlands Division invitational team.

Matches
Scores and results list New Zealand's points tally first.

Touring party

Manager: P.W. Mitchell
Assistant Manager: Bryce Rope
Captain: Stu Wilson

Backs
Kieran Crowley (Taranaki)
Robbie Deans (Canterbury)
Stu Wilson (Wellington)
Bernie Fraser (Wellington)
Bruce Smith (Waikato)
Craig Green (Canterbury)
Steven Pokere (Southland)
Warwick Taylor (Canterbury)
Ian Dunn (North Auckland)
Wayne Smith (Canterbury)
Andrew Donald (Wanganui)
David Kirk (Otago)

Forwards
Murray Mexted (Wellington)
Geoff Old (Manawatu)
Mark Shaw (Manawatu)
Jock Hobbs (Canterbury)
Frank Shelford (Hawke's Bay)
Albert Anderson (Canterbury)
Gary Braid (Bay of Plenty)
Alastair Robinson (North Auckland)
Murray Davie (Canterbury)
Scott Crichton (Wellington)
Kevin Boroevich (King Country)
Brian McGrattan (Wellington)
Hika Reid (Bay of Plenty)
Brett Wilson (Counties)

References

1983 rugby union tours
1983
1983
1983
1983 in New Zealand rugby union
1983–84 in English rugby union
1983–84 in Scottish rugby union
1983–84 in European rugby union